Arbanitis dereki is a species of armoured trap-door spider in the family Idiopidae, and is endemic to New South Wales. 

It was first described by Graham Wishart in 2006 as Misgolas dereki, but was transferred to the genus, Arbanitis, by Michael Rix and others in 2017.

References

Idiopidae
Spiders described in 1992
Spiders of Australia
Fauna of New South Wales